Francisco Javier "Javi" Montero Rubio (born 14 January 1999) is a Spanish professional footballer who plays for 2. Bundesliga club Hamburger SV, on loan from Beşiktaş. Mainly a central defender, he can also play as a left-back.

Club career

Atlético Madrid
Born in Seville, Andalusia, Montero joined Atlético Madrid's youth setup in 2014 at the age of 15, from hometown club AD Nervión. In 2018, after finishing his development, he was called up to the first team by manager Diego Simeone for the pre-season, playing with protective glasses due to an eye injury suffered back in 2017.

Montero made his senior debut with the reserves on 23 September 2018, starting in a 4–2 Segunda División B away win against CDA Navalcarnero. He first appeared with the main squad on 30 October, playing the full 90 minutes in a 1–0 away defeat of UE Sant Andreu in the round of 32 of the Copa del Rey.

Montero's first UEFA Champions League match occurred on 6 November 2018, when he came on as a half-time substitute for injured José Giménez in a 2–0 home victory over Borussia Dortmund in the group stage. He completed a trio of debuts four days later, when he started and was replaced by Gelson Martins early into the second half of an eventual 3–2 La Liga win against Athletic Bilbao also at the Metropolitano Stadium.

On 2 September 2019, Montero renewed his contract until 2024, and was immediately loaned to Deportivo de La Coruña for the season. He started in all his appearances but one during his spell in Galicia, but his side suffered relegation from Segunda División.

Beşiktaş
Montero joined Beşiktaş J.K. on a season-long loan on 2 September 2020. One year later, he signed a permanent deal.

Hamburger SV (loan) 
On 15 January 2023, Montero joined German side Hamburger SV on loan until the end of the season.

International career
Montero won his only cap for Spain at under-21 level on 10 October 2019, featuring 17 minutes in a 1–1 friendly draw with Germany held in Córdoba.

Career statistics

Club

Honours
Beşiktaş
Süper Lig: 2020–21
Turkish Cup: 2020–21
Turkish Super Cup: 2021

References

External links

1999 births
Living people
Spanish footballers
Footballers from Seville
Association football defenders
La Liga players
Segunda División players
Segunda División B players
Atlético Madrid B players
Atlético Madrid footballers
Deportivo de La Coruña players
Süper Lig players
Beşiktaş J.K. footballers
Hamburger SV players
Spain under-21 international footballers
Spanish expatriate footballers
Expatriate footballers in Turkey
Spanish expatriate sportspeople in Turkey
Expatriate footballers in Germany
Spanish expatriate sportspeople in Germany